The 1998 Indianapolis Colts season was the 46th season for the team in the National Football League and 15th in Indianapolis. The Indianapolis Colts finished the National Football League's 1998 season with a record of 3 wins and 13 losses, and finished fifth in the AFC East division.

Coming off a 3–13 season the year before, the Colts drafted quarterback Peyton Manning with the first overall pick in the 1998 NFL Draft. Manning would mark the beginning of a new era for the Colts, as he would lead them to their second Super Bowl title nine seasons later.

This season was Marshall Faulk's last with the Colts as he was traded to the St. Louis Rams in the off-season. He had his best seasons in St. Louis, helping the Rams to two Super Bowls in 1999 and 2001 and winning the league's MVP in 2000.

On November 29, the Colts played their first game in Baltimore since the controversial relocation in 1984.

Offseason

NFL Draft

Undrafted free agents

Personnel

Staff

Roster

Regular season

Schedule 

Note: Intra-division opponents are in bold text.

Standings

Season summary

Week 11 vs Jets

References

See also 
 History of the Indianapolis Colts
 Indianapolis Colts seasons
 Colts–Patriots rivalry

Indianapolis Colts
Indianapolis Colts seasons
Indianapolis Colts